Dispatch EP is an EP that was released by Dispatch on May 17, 2011. It is the band's first studio record in over ten years and was followed by the full-length album Circles Around the Sun in 2012. Upon its release, the EP shot to #2 on the iTunes album charts. The track Melon Bend has been released for free download via the band's website and was performed live on Late Night with Jimmy Fallon on April 27, 2011.

Track listing
 "Melon Bend" - 4:24
 "Con Man" - 4:08
 "Valentine" - 3:33
 "Beto" - 4:41
 "Broken American" - 4:31
 "Turn This Ship Around" - 4:04

Personnel
Brad "Braddigan" Corrigan - vocals, drums, percussion, guitar, ukulele & harmonica
Chad "Chetro" Stokes - vocals, guitar, keyboards, percussion & bass
Pete "Repete" Heimbold - vocals, bass & guitar
Boo Reiners - banjo
Paul Stivitts - drums
Reinaldo de Jesús - percussion

References

Dispatch EPs
2011 EPs